John Parkinson is the name of:
John Parkinson (botanist) (1567–1650), English herbalist
John B. Parkinson (1861–1935), English architect in Los Angeles
John Parkinson (politician) (1870–1941), British Labour Party MP for Wigan, 1918–1941
John Parkinson (cardiologist) (1885–1976), English cardiologist, a namesake of Wolff-Parkinson-White syndrome
John Edward Parkinson (1955–2004), British academic in UK company law
John Parkinson (footballer) (born 1944), Australian rules footballer

See also
Jack Parkinson (disambiguation)